Preechaya Pongthananikorn (born February 14, 1990), nicknamed Ice, is a Thai model and actress. She is best known in her lead roles in two of the highest grossing Thai films; ATM: Er Rak Error (2012) as Jib and in I Fine..Thank You..Love You (2014) as Tutor Pleng. Later on, Ice appeared on television contests such as The Mask Singer (Thai season 2) in 2017 and Dance Dance Dance Thailand in 2018; reaching to semi-finals in both programs. She then started to play lakorn (Thai drama series) and signed with CH3 Thailand in the same year but decided to go freelance after her contract with them expired in 2021.

Filmography

Movies

Television drama

Television Shows and Performances

Discography

Music Video Appearances

Songs and Official Soundtracks

Concerts 
 GTH Day: Play It Forward (2013)
 7 Wonders Concert (2015)
 STAR THEQUE GTH 11th Year (2015)

Awards 
 Outstanding Female Rising Star of 2012 from ATM Er Rak Error
 MThai Top Talk Awards 2012
 Thai Film Director Association: Best Actress of 2014 from I Fine Thank You Love You
 Daradaily The Great Awards 4: Best Actress of 2014 from I Fine Thank You Love You
 Osaka Asian Film Festival - Yakushi Pearl Award (International)
 SiamDara Awards 2015: Best Actress from I Fine Thank You Love You

Other Works 
 KOI x Kwankao: The Return of Winter Wonderland Fashion Gala
 Dubbing MAMA's voice of Mr. Queen to Thai for Viu (streaming media)

MC
 Online 
 20 : Face Confidence On Air Line TV
 20 : On Air YouTube:Ice preechaya (ยังไม่เริ่ม)

References

Preechaya on the Top 15 Highest Paid Asian Instagram Influencer by Hopper HQ

External links 
 Preechaya Pongthananikorn Official Page
 Ice Preechaya Official IG

Preechaya Pongthananikorn
Preechaya Pongthananikorn
1990 births
Living people
Preechaya Pongthananikorn
Preechaya Pongthananikorn
Preechaya Pongthananikorn
Preechaya Pongthananikorn
Preechaya Pongthananikorn
Preechaya Pongthananikorn
Thai television personalities
Preechaya Pongthananikorn